Cristóbal Torriente (November 16, 1893 – April 11, 1938) called  Babe Ruth of Cuba , was a Cuban outfielder in Negro league baseball with multiple teams. He played from 1912 to 1932 and was primarily a pull hitter, though he could hit with power to all fields. He had a stocky and slightly bowlegged build, but was known for deceptive power and a strong, accurate arm from center field. Indianapolis ABC's manager C.I. Taylor stated, "If I see Torriente walking up the other side of the street, I would say, 'There walks a ballclub.'" Torriente was elected into the National Baseball Hall of Fame in 2006.

Early years 
Torriente was born on November 16, 1893, in Cienfuegos, Cuba. He began his playing career as a pitcher and part time outfield at age 17 with his hometown's local amateur side named Yara Club, claiming a juvenile amateur district championship in 1910. At age 17, he also joined the Cuban Army and “was assigned to the artillery because he was husky enough to hoist the heavy artillery pieces onto the mules.” At this time, little else is known of Torriente's family and childhood.

Cuban League career

Torriente played in his homeland from 1913–1927 and holds the record for the highest career batting average in Cuban winter league history (.352). He earned two batting titles and hit as high as .402. In 1920, his team, Almendares, played a nine-game series against the New York Giants. The Giants added Babe Ruth for this tour of Cuba. Torriente outhit Ruth in most categories and Almendares beat the Giants, five games to four. Along with Martín Dihigo and José Méndez, Torriente is considered one of the greatest baseball players from Cuba. He was one of the first class of inductees of the Cuban Baseball Hall of Fame in 1939.

Negro league career

Independent Ball 
Torriente played much of the summer of 1915 and 1916 for the "Western" Cuban Stars team until an argument arose with the St. Louis manager in 1916. He tracked down former teammate and friend José Méndez and was hired by J. L. Wilkinson to play for his All Nations just before a big series with C. I. Taylor's Indianapolis ABCs and Rube Foster's Chicago American Giants. Torriente would play several years for both teams.

Negro Major Leagues

Chicago American Giants 
Torriente played on the great Chicago American Giants teams of 1918–1925, and he was a member of the club when they were founding members of the Negro National League in 1920. Torriente led the American Giants to consecutive pennants from 1920 to 1922 while batting .411, .352, and .289 for these seasons. He won the inaugural Negro National League batting title in 1920 with a .411 average. He led the league in on-base percentage that year along with in 1923 and 1924, each over .465. He also had an OPS of over 1.000 in four of his nine full seasons. In 1921, he took part in the second ever postseason series held between black baseball teams, as the Giants faced the Eastern independent Hilldale Club. While the Giants lost the series three games to two (with one tie), Torriente hit a home run in Game 1 of the series.

Kansas City Monarchs 
Torriente was traded to the Kansas City Monarchs in 1926 and led the team with a .381 batting average. In the championship playoff series against his old American Giants teammates, Torriente logged a .407 batting average.

Detroit Stars 
Torriente briefly appeared for the Detroit Stars in 1920. Following a dispute involving a stolen diamond ring, he walked away from the Monarchs and was later signed by the Detroit Stars, where he played from 1927-1928.

Last years 
Torriente, now primarily a pitcher again, played for the independent Gilkerson's Union Giants from 1929-1930. In 1932, he appeared for the Atlanta Black Crackers and Cleveland Cubs, both independent teams at the time. Torriente finished his major league career with the Louisville Black Caps of the Negro Southern League, pitching a single game in relief. In 1938, Black Crackers manager Don Pelham unsuccessfully attempted to lobby Torriente to return to play, but no records exist of him taking the field again.

Personal life
Torriente was notorious for his love of the night life and this caused him disputes with team management throughout his career. Torriente was sent to the bench in front of 8,000 spectators in 1915 after he "kicked to an umpire." He put on his street clothes and sat on the bench, then umpire Goekle sent him to the bleachers, and sent an officer of the law after him. Again on August 23, 1915, Torriente kicked umpire Kelly after Kelly called him out when Torriente attempted to steal third base. A fight with Crawford during the game spilled out onto the street after the game, and the two men attacked each other with paving stones left out when street workers were repairing a water main. Rube Foster broke up the fight.

In 1923, he was sent out of the game in the third inning after objecting to umpire Bert Gholston's call at second base. He reportedly used "awful" language, then threw dirt on the umpire's "newly creased trousers." His temper caused him to walk off the Monarchs in 1926 after a dispute involving a stolen diamond ring.

In 1918, 24 year-old Torriente registered with the World War I draft. He listed his current occupation as "not working" and currently living at 3448 Wabash Avenue in Chicago, Illinois. He listed himself as a Cuban citizen and his closest living relative as his mother, Mrs. Felipa Torriente of Havana.

After baseball, Torriente lived for a short time in Ybor City, Florida and faded into obscurity.

Death and legacy 
Torriente died in New York City at age 44, after a long battle with alcoholism and tuberculosis. An old Cuban teammate, Rogelio Crespo, told John Holway that “they draped a Cuban flag over his coffin, and a politician arranged to return the body to Havana,” where it was interred in the Cementerio de Cristóbal Colón with dozens of other Cuban baseball stars. In 1939, he was named to the inaugural class of the Cuban Baseball Hall of Fame. The Pittsburgh Courier named Torriente to their All Time Negro League team in 1952, calling him "a prodigious hitter, a rifle-armed thrower, and a tower of strength on the defense."

In the 2001 book The New Bill James Historical Baseball Abstract, Bill James ranked Torriente as the 67th greatest baseball player ever. Torriente was elected to the Baseball Hall of Fame in 2006. After years of research, his grave was finally identified in 2020 by Dr. Machado Mendoza and his team in the Cementerio de Cristóbal Colón.

References

External links
 and Baseball-Reference Black Baseball stats and Seamheads

1893 births
1938 deaths
National Baseball Hall of Fame inductees
Cuban baseball players
All Nations players
Atlanta Black Crackers players
Chicago American Giants players
Cleveland Cubs players
Cuban Stars (West) players
Detroit Stars players
Kansas City Monarchs players
People from Cienfuegos
Louisville Black Caps players
20th-century deaths from tuberculosis
Tuberculosis deaths in New York (state)
Alcohol-related deaths in New York City